Tämnarån is an approximately 60 km long river in the northern parts of the Swedish historical province Uppland.

References

Rivers of Uppsala County